Ulaanbaatar MMC Energy is a men's professional 3x3 team based in Ulaanbaatar, Mongolia which plays the FIBA 3x3 Men's Pro Circuit. The team is sponsored by the Mongolian firm Mongolian Mining Corporation (MMC).

History
Ulaanbaatar MMC Energy was established in 2017, and regularly competed in FIBA 3x3 Men's Pro Circuit tournaments. In 2019, the team, which is composed of the core of the Mongolia national 3x3 team, made a bid to be among the four teams to outright qualify for the men's 3x3 tournament in the 2020 Summer Olympics via men's national team rankings. At fourth place, Mongolia would have qualified if Japan did not use its privilege as host to enter its men's team without going through the qualifiers.

At the 2019 FIBA 3x3 Jeju Challenger in Jeju, South Korea, Ulaanbaatar became the first Asian team to win in a Grand Prix-level event in the FIBA 3x3 Pro Circuit by winning 13-10 over Slovenian team, Piran in the final. Within the same year, they made their best finish in a FIBA 3x3 World Tour tournament in the 2019 Los Angeles Masters by placing fourth.

Players

Current roster

Season by season

References

Sport in Ulaanbaatar
Basketball teams in Mongolia
FIBA 3x3 World Tour teams